Noyes Mountain may refer to the following American mountains:
 Noyes Mountain (Maine)
 Noyes Mountain, a summit of the Mentasta Mountains in Alaska

See also
 Mount Noyes, Alberta, Canada
 Mount Noyes (Washington), United States